Addison Courtney Gumbert (October 10, 1867 – April 23, 1925) was a pitcher for Major League Baseball in the 19th century. His brother Billy Gumbert and great nephew Harry Gumbert were also Major League Baseball players.

Early life
Addison Gumbert was born on October 10, 1867, or 1868, in Pittsburgh, Pennsylvania, to Robert and Henrietta Gumbert. At the 1880 United States Census, Robert worked as a dispatcher, while Henrietta was unemployed, with her occupation listed as a "keephouse". The family lived on Frankstown Avenue in the 21st Ward of Pittsburgh.

Post-baseball career
After retiring from baseball, Gumbert had a career as a public official in Allegheny County and Pittsburgh. He was elected as Allegheny County sheriff in 1906 and as an Allegheny County commissioner in 1915. While sheriff in 1908, he was elected president of the Western Pennsylvania Hockey League.

References

External links

1868 births
1925 deaths
Chicago White Stockings players
Boston Reds (PL) players
Chicago Colts players
Pittsburgh Pirates players
Brooklyn Grooms players
Brooklyn Bridegrooms players
Philadelphia Phillies players
Major League Baseball pitchers
19th-century baseball players
Baseball players from Pittsburgh
Zanesville Kickapoos players
Burials at Homewood Cemetery